The karate competitions at the 2013 Mediterranean Games in Mersin took place between 28 June and 29 June at the Edip Buran Sport Hall. 

Athletes competed in 10 weight categories. Turkey was the most successful nation with 6 gold and 2 silver medals.

Medal summary

Men's events

Women's events

Medal table

References

Sports at the 2013 Mediterranean Games
2013
2013 in karate
International karate competitions hosted by Turkey